Nestor Fabian Correa, commonly Nestor Correa  (born August 23, 1974) is Uruguayan football player. He is now retired.

Career

Club
He played Liverpool. and South Korean side Jeonbuk Hyundai Motors and Jeonnam Dragons.

International
He was squad of 1991 FIFA U-17 World Championship and 1993 FIFA World Youth Championship.

Honors and awards

Player

Individual

References

External links
 
 

1973 births
Living people
Association football forwards
Uruguayan footballers
Uruguayan expatriate footballers
Uruguay international footballers
Uruguay youth international footballers
Uruguay under-20 international footballers
Liverpool F.C. (Montevideo) players
K League 1 players
Jeonbuk Hyundai Motors players
Jeonnam Dragons players
Expatriate footballers in South Korea
Uruguayan expatriate sportspeople in South Korea
Association football midfielders